Erik Arutiunian (born 19 October 2004) is a Belarusian tennis player.

Arutiunian has a career high ATP singles ranking of 909, achieved on 15 August 2022. He also has a career high ATP doubles ranking of 456, achieved on 20 February 2023. 

Arutiunian represents Belarus at the Davis Cup, where he has a W/L record of 0–2.

ATP Challenger and ITF World Tennis Tour finals

Doubles: 5 (2–3)
{|
|

References

External links

2004 births
Living people
Belarusian male tennis players
21st-century Belarusian people